Pressed is a 2011 Canadian crime drama film directed by Justin Donnelly and starring Luke Goss, Tyler Johnston, Jeffrey Ballard, and Michael Eklund. It is the debut directing project for Justin Donnelly.

Plot
Business executive Brian Parker (played by Goss) has been fired from his job at a top investment firm and is facing serious financial troubles. He decides to invest his personal money in a dangerous drug deal that may end his problems quickly. However, two young joyriders, Jesse and Sam, steal the illicit drug money. The risky situation changes lives, some of them for good.

Cast
Luke Goss as Brian
Michael Eklund as Jimmy 
Tyler Johnston as Jesse 
Jeffrey Ballard as Sam 
Erica Carroll as Leanne 
Andrew Hedge as Officer Black 
Craig Stanghetta as Joey 'The Boss'

References

External links

2011 films
2011 crime thriller films
Canadian crime thriller films
English-language Canadian films
2010s English-language films
2010s Canadian films